The C. Lewis Harrison House is a historic house at 14 Eliot Memorial Road in Newton, Massachusetts.  The 1 3/4 story wood-frame house was built c. 1915 for Charles Lewis Harrison, a Boston lawyer.  It is an excellent example of a Craftsman cottage, attractively set on a wooded lot overlooking the Commonwealth Country Club.  Its roof has a large shed-roof dormer, above which there are two eyebrow windows.  The roof slopes down over a porch, and is supported by large rustic concrete columns.  The main entrance is traditional in appearance, with flanking sidelight windows and a fanlight above.  Twin rubblestone chimneys rise from the sides of the house.

The house was listed on the National Register of Historic Places in 1990.

See also
 National Register of Historic Places listings in Newton, Massachusetts

References

Houses on the National Register of Historic Places in Newton, Massachusetts
Houses completed in 1915